Field Marshal Sir Arthur Arnold Barrett  (3 June 1857 – 20 October 1926) was a British officer of the Indian Army. He saw action at the Siege of the Sherpur Cantonment in December 1879 and at the Battle of Kandahar in September 1880 during the Second Anglo-Afghan War and went on to serve in the Hunza-Nagar Campaign in 1891. During the First World War he was General Officer Commanding the Poona Division which successfully took Basra in Mesopotamia in November 1914 and then Al-Qurnah in Mesopotamia in December 1914. He spent the rest of the War commanding the Northern Army in which role he took part in operations against the Mahsuds in Spring 1917. He saw action again as the senior British officer on the ground during the Third Anglo-Afghan War in 1919 before retiring in May 1920.

Early life and service
Born the son of Alfred Barrett (a clergyman) and Emma Barrett (née Collins), Barrett was commissioned sub-lieutenant in the 44th Regiment of Foot on 10 September 1875 and immediately sailed to join his regiment in Secunderabad, India. He was promoted to lieutenant in June 1878 with seniority backdated to the date of his commission. He transferred from the 44th Foot to the Indian Staff Corps on 17 January 1879 and was posted to the 3rd Sikhs, a regiment of the Punjab Frontier Force, and saw action at the Siege of the Sherpur Cantonment in December 1879 and at the Battle of Kandahar in September 1880 during the Second Anglo-Afghan War.

Barrett transferred to the 1st battalion the 5th Gurkha Rifles in 1882 and, having been promoted to captain on 10 September 1886, he took part in the Hunza-Nagar Campaign in 1891.

Later service in India
Promoted to major on 10 September 1895, Barrett became deputy assistant quartermaster-general and then assistant quartermaster-general of the large force mobilised for the Tirah Campaign in 1897. He was mentioned in dispatches and promoted to brevet lieutenant-colonel on 20 May 1898 on appointment as assistant adjutant-general of the Punjab Frontier Force. He became Commanding Officer of the 1st battalion the 5th Gurkha Rifles in 1899 and received promotion to the substantive rank of lieutenant-colonel on 10 September 1901 and to brevet colonel on 11 October 1902. He was appointed Companion of the Order of the Bath (CB) in 1903 and became deputy adjutant-general at Northern Command in India with the substantive rank of colonel on 20 February 1905. He was promoted major-general on 1 December 1906 and given command of the Nowshera Brigade on 29 March 1907. He commanded the second brigade in the Bazar Valley Campaign in February 1908 and operations against the Mohmands a few months later and for this he was advanced to Knight Commander of the Order of the Bath (KCB) on 14 August 1908. He was appointed Adjutant-General, India on 1 April 1909  and, having been promoted to lieutenant general on 23 October 1911, he was given command of the Poona Division on 21 February 1912. He was appointed Knight Commander of the Royal Victorian Order (KCVO) on 14 January 1912.

First World War and aftermath
On the declaration of war on the Ottoman Empire in November 1914 Barrett was sent to Mesopotamia with his division and occupied the city of Basra later that month. Before the end of the year he had pushed forwards to occupy Al-Qurnah. When the troops in Mesopotamia were reorganised as a corps under John Nixon in 1915 he retained command of the 6th Division, but soon resigned due to ill-health, passing command to Charles Townshend. He returned to India, was appointed Knight Commander of the Order of the Star of India (KCSI), and became General Officer Commanding the Northern Army on 31 May 1916. He commanded operations against the Mahsuds in March to August 1917. Promoted to full general on 1 August 1917, he was appointed ADC General to the King on 3 November 1917 and was promoted to Knight Grand Cross of the Order of the Bath (GCB) in the 1918 King's Birthday Honours.

When the Third Anglo-Afghan War broke out in May 1919 Barrett was given command of the North-West Frontier Force and was the senior officer on the ground throughout the war. He was promoted to Knight Grand Commander of the Order of the Star of India (GCSI) on 1 January 1920.

Retirement
Barrett retired from the Indian Army on 31 May 1920. He was promoted to field marshal on 12 April 1921 and received the Japanese Order of the Rising Sun 1st Class on 19 August 1921. He died at his home in Sharnbrook, Bedfordshire on 20 October 1926.

Family
In 1894 Barrett married Mary Haye; they had one daughter. After his first wife died he married Ella Lafone in 1907; they had no children.

References

Sources

Further reading
 Obituary, The Times, 21 October 1926

|-
 

1857 births
1926 deaths
People from Carshalton
British field marshals
Indian Army generals of World War I
British military personnel of the Second Anglo-Afghan War
British military personnel of the Third Anglo-Afghan War
Knights Grand Cross of the Order of the Bath
Knights Grand Commander of the Order of the Star of India
Knights Commander of the Royal Victorian Order
Grand Cordons of the Order of the Rising Sun
44th Regiment of Foot officers
British military personnel of the Hunza-Naga Campaign
Indian Staff Corps officers
British Indian Army generals
Military personnel from Surrey